Turtles Go Hollywood is a supplement published by Palladium Books in 1990 for the comic superhero roleplaying game Teenage Mutant Ninja Turtles & Other Strangeness using the Palladium Megaversal system.

Publication history
Turtles Go Hollywood was written by Daniel Greenberg with interior and cover art by Kevin Long, and was published by Palladium Books in 1990 as a 48-page book.

Contents
Turtles Go Hollywood is a series of five linked scenarios set in Hollywood. The Turtles seek to stop a plot by the mutant villain Labb Ratt to use subliminal messages to brainwash moviegoers everywhere. It takes place directly after the Truckin' Turtles series of adventures.

Reception
In the June 1990 edition of Games International (Issue 15), the reviewer said the presentation was poor, but that inside the cover, this was "a scenario far superior to the usual TMNT offerings." The reviewer liked the "level of subtlety demonstrated primarily by the relative lack of mindless fight scenes" as well as "the very open plot which encourages player creativity." The reviewer concluded that this was "easily the best TMNT scenario."

Other reviews
GamesMaster International Issue 1 - Aug 1990

References

1990 books
Teenage Mutant Ninja Turtles & Other Strangeness